Kerstin Szymkowiak (born Kerstin Jürgens on 19 December 1977 in Siegen) is a German retired skeleton racer who has competed since 2002. She won three bronze medals in the women's skeleton event, earning them in 2004, 2008, and 2009.

Her best overall seasonal finish in the women's Skeleton World Cup title was third in 2004-5.

Jürgens married after the 2007-08 Skeleton World Cup season and has been competing since in the 2008-09 Skeleton World Cup season under her married name. She finished second behind defending world champion Anja Huber of Germany in the season opener at Winterberg on November 28, 2008.

Szymkowiak's nickname is the "Ice Tiger" (Eistiger in German). She earned the silver medal at the 2010 Winter Olympics in Vancouver.

After retiring from the sport Szymkowiak was appointed an Athlete Role Model for the 2012 Winter Youth Olympics in Innsbruck. In May 2012 the Swiss bobsleigh and skeleton federation announced that Szymkowiak had been elected as head of their skeleton section.

Szymkowiak's husband Philippe is a massage therapist for the Swiss national bobsleigh team. She gave birth to a daughter, Noalie, in September 2010.

References

External links
  
 
 
 
 "German Sweep Women's Skeleton in Altenberg". International Bobsleigh & Skeleton Federation. 18 December 2009. Accessed 18 December 2009.
 
 

1977 births
Living people
German female skeleton racers
Olympic skeleton racers of Germany
Skeleton racers at the 2010 Winter Olympics
Olympic silver medalists for Germany
Olympic medalists in skeleton
Medalists at the 2010 Winter Olympics
Universiade medalists in skeleton
Sportspeople from Siegen
Universiade bronze medalists for Germany
Competitors at the 2005 Winter Universiade
20th-century German women
21st-century German women